Follow the Yellow Brick Road Tour was a concert tour by English musician Elton John taking place in North America and Europe in promotion of the 40th anniversary re-release of 1973's Goodbye Yellow Brick Road.

Background
The tour to support the 40th anniversary re-release of 1973's Goodbye Yellow Brick Road started on 12 March 2014 in Beaumont, Texas and ended in December 2014 in New York City.

Set list
"Funeral for a Friend/Love Lies Bleeding"
"Bennie and the Jets"
"Candle in the Wind"
"Grey Seal"
"Levon"
"Tiny Dancer"
"Holiday Inn"
"Mona Lisas and Mad Hatters"
"Believe"
"Philadelphia Freedom"
"Roy Rogers"
"Goodbye Yellow Brick Road"
"Rocket Man"
"Hey Ahab"
"I Guess That's Why They Call It the Blues"
"The One"
"Oceans Away"
"Someone Saved My Life Tonight"
"Sad Songs"
"All the Girls Love Alice"
"Home Again"
"Don't Let the Sun Go Down on Me"
"I'm Still Standing"
"The Bitch Is Back"
"Your Sister Can't Twist (But She Can Rock 'n Roll)"
"Saturday Night's Alright for Fighting"
Encore
"Your Song"
"Crocodile Rock"

Tour dates

Tour band
Elton John – Piano, vocals
Davey Johnstone – Guitar, banjo, backing vocals
Matt Bissonette – Bass guitar, backing vocals
Kim Bullard – keyboards
John Mahon – Percussion, backing vocals
Nigel Olsson – drums, backing vocals
Luka Šulić – Cello
Stjepan Hauser – Cello
Lisa Stone – Backing vocals
Rose Stone – Backing vocals
Tata Vega – Backing vocals
Jean Witherspoon – Backing vocals
Sources:

Notes

External links
Elton John's official website

References

Elton John concert tours
2014 concert tours